Albert Horsell (1909–1982) was a rugby league footballer in the Australian competition, the New South Wales Rugby League.

Horsell was a member of the Eastern Suburbs club in the 1936 and 1938 seasons. In 1936, Eastern Suburbs won their 6th premiership.

References

 The Encyclopedia Of Rugby League; Alan Whiticker & Glen Hudson

Australian rugby league players
Sydney Roosters players
1909 births
1982 deaths
Place of birth missing
Rugby league fullbacks